Nepal Bar Council is an independent legal institution established by the Nepal Bar Council Act, 1993 with a major objective to regulate law practice in Nepal. It conducts examination for issuing the licence for law practice and keeps record of the law practitioners.

Membership
Any Nepali Citizen who passed the Legal Practitioner examination with five years of experience can take part in the membership process. Legal Practitioner is the one who passed Bachelor degree while a Pleader is one who passes the intermediate degree in law.

Councilors
Nepal Bar Council has the following Councilors:
The Attorney General of Nepal
President of Nepal Bar Association 
Registrar of Supreme Court of Nepal
Dean of Institute of Law from Tribhuvan University
Senior  advocates  elected  from each Development  Region of Nepal   
Two senior advocates nominated by Nepal Bar Association

Examination of Legal Practitioners
Nepal Bar Council carries out Exams for Legal Practitioners at least once a year. The mode of examination is written and oral Examination.

Nepal Bar Council Office
Nepal Bar Council Office is located at Kupandole, Lalitpur.

Controversies
 The appointment of councilors are said to be politically influenced.

See also
Nepal Bar Association
Nepal Medical Council
Nepal Engineering Council

External links
Nepal Bar council Act 1993
official homepage

References

Education in Nepal
1993 establishments in Nepal
Law of Nepal
Bar associations of Asia
Regulatory agencies of Nepal
Regulators of barristers and advocates